Jon Arne Gunnerud  is a Norwegian handball player.

He made his debut on the Norwegian national team in 1962, 
and played 33 matches for the national team between 1962 and 1969. He participated at the 1967 World Men's Handball Championship.

References

Year of birth missing (living people)
Living people
Norwegian male handball players